The People's Defense of the Autonomous Province of Western Bosnia (Bosnian: Narodna Odbrana Zapadne Bosne, NOZB; Serbian: Народна одбрана Западне Босне, НОЗБ / Narodna Odbrana Zapadne Bosne, NOZB) was a paramilitary unit founded and led by Fikret Abdić that fought in the Bosnian War (1993–1995) during the Yugoslav Wars. It served as the de facto army of the APZB.

Structure 
Structure of the People's Defense of the Autonomous Province of Western Bosnia:

 1st brigade NOZB
 2nd brigade NOZB
 3rd brigade NOZB
 4th brigade NOZB
 5th brigade NOZB
 6th brigade NOZB

Special Units 

 The Šejla unit
 The Ajkini unit
 The Metal unit
 The Golubovi unit

Battles

Siege of Bihać 

From 1993 to 1995, the NOZB fought against the 5th Corps alongside Republika Srpska and the Republic of Serbian Krajina.

Operation Tiger 1994 

On June 2, 1994, the 5th Corps, under the command of Atif Dudaković, overran and seized the territory of Western Bosnia and Fikret Abdić fled to Zagreb for safety. The battle was a huge success for the ARBiH, which was able to rout Abdić's forces and manage to push the Serb forces from Bihać and abolish Western Bosnia temporarily.

Operation Spider 

On November 4, 1994, the Autonomous Province of Western Bosnia was re-established after a Serb counterattack against the Bosnian forces.

Legacy 
In 2013, the Constitutional Court of Bosnia and Herzegovina issued a decision that equated the rights of former soldiers of the NOZB with those of the members of the ARBiH and the HVO.

See also 

 Territorial Defense (Yugoslavia)
 Territorial Defence Force of the Republic of Bosnia and Herzegovina
 Slovenian Territorial Defence

References 

Bosnian War